Donald Graham (April 23, 1848 – 1944) was a Scottish-born farmer and political figure in British Columbia. He represented Yale-East in the Legislative Assembly of British Columbia from 1894 to 1898.

He was born in Ardallin, Sutherlandshire, the son of Alexander Graham, and was educated in Tain, Ross-shire. Graham came to Canada in 1865. In 1875, he moved to British Columbia, settling in the Okanagan Valley. For a time, Graham drove a pack-train for a government survey party. In 1885, he married Adelaide Grier. Graham served as a justice of the peace and was reeve of Spallumcheen for three terms. He was defeated when he ran for reelection in 1898. Graham was one of the promoters of the Okanagan Flour Mills Co. Ltd, a co-operative flour milling company formed in 1895.

References 

1848 births
1944 deaths
Independent MLAs in British Columbia